Astro-Creep: 2000 – Songs of Love, Destruction and Other Synthetic Delusions of the Electric Head (or simply Astro-Creep: 2000) is the fourth and final studio album by American heavy metal band White Zombie, released on April 11, 1995, by Geffen Records. The album proved to be their most commercially successful recording, peaking at number six on the Billboard 200 with the aid of the popular hit singles "More Human than Human" and "Super-Charger Heaven". It was the band's only album to feature John Tempesta on drums.

Production
The album was highly anticipated due to the surprise success of the band's previous release La Sexorcisto: Devil Music Volume One. Ivan DePrume, the band's long-time drummer, had left the band to start Burningsound studios during their touring sessions for that album. The band later recruited former Exodus and Testament drummer John Tempesta for the recording of this album. The album had help from significant industrial musicians, such as the keyboard work from Charlie Clouser, who had worked with artists like Nine Inch Nails, Rammstein, Marilyn Manson, Killing Joke, and more. They had also hired Terry Date (Deftones, Pantera, Soundgarden) to produce Astro-Creep: 2000 for them.  According to J., the album comprises seventy-two track recordings, forty-eight of which are analog and twenty-four being digital recordings. The entire album took three months to write and another three to record. For the album, the band had a much bigger recording budget and more freedom in time.

Music and lyrics
The album is much heavier than La Sexorcisto and has been called "white-trash-on-acid metal" by Stephen Thomas Erlewine of AllMusic. The band also down-tuned the guitars and bass to give it the darker sound that the songs required, going from standard E tuning to dropped C# (1.5 steps below standard E).

Much of the lyrics are also darker and more disturbing than on the previous album, and are arranged more like twisted poetry than La Sexorcisto's pseudo-rap scores, dealing with murder, the undead, blasphemy, and satanic elements.

As with the previous two albums, many of the songs feature snippets of dialogue from horror and cult films including The Omega Man, Shaft, The Haunting, The Curse of Frankenstein and To the Devil a Daughter. The title "More Human Than Human" is the motto of the Tyrell Corp. from the film  Blade Runner and "I am the nexus one, I want more life fucker, I ain't done, yeah" is an artistic rephrasing of lines from Blade Runner.

Rob has said he favors this album to the previous one, stating, "I was never that happy with it [La Sexorcisto]. In some respects, it was probably the best thing we could do at the time under the circumstances; and that this record was exactly what we wanted it to sound like."

Reception

The album is White Zombie's best-selling album, being certified double Platinum by the RIAA and selling over 2,600,000 copies in America since its release. There was also a limited 50,000 pressings of this album on see-through blue vinyl. The album has been certified by CAN platinum. The album was nominated for a Grammy Award for Best Engineered Album and the band's biggest hit, "More Human than Human", nominated for a Grammy Award for Best Metal Performance in 1996.

To promote the album, music videos for "More Human than Human", "Electric Head Pt. 2 (The Ecstasy)", and a live video for "Super-Charger Heaven" were released. In 1995, "More Human than Human" won the MTV Video Music Award for Best Rock Video and was considered by Rob Zombie to be his favorite White Zombie video.

There were also plans to start filming a video for "Blood, Milk and Sky" after Christmas as well as eventually filming a video for every song on the album. However, these plans were scrapped when the band dissolved.

Accolades

Track listing

I "Blood, Milk and Sky" contains the hidden track "Where the Sidewalk Ends, the Bug Parade Begins" at 8:45, after 3 minutes of silence. On the digital version, however, the hidden track is its own 2:33 track.

Personnel
Adapted from the Astro-Creep: 2000 – Songs of Love, Destruction and Other Synthetic Delusions of the Electric Head liner notes.

White Zombie
 Rob Zombie – vocals, illustrations, art direction
 Jay Yuenger – guitars
 Sean Yseult – bass, art direction
 John Tempesta – drums
Additional musicians
 Charlie Clouser – keyboards, programming

Production and additional personnel
 Terry Date – production, recording, mixing
 Lamont Hyde – mixing assistant
 Ted Jensen – mastering
 Wade Norton – recording assistant
 Ulrich Wild – recording

Chart positions

Album

Singles

Release history

References

External links 
 

White Zombie (band) albums
1995 albums
Geffen Records albums
Albums produced by Terry Date